Willy Mason (born November 21, 1984) is an American singer-songwriter.

Early life 

Mason was born in White Plains, New York, the son of Jemima James and Michael Mason, both songwriters. Mason is a direct descendant of the 19th-century philosopher William James, the brother of novelist Henry James.

When Mason was five, he and his family moved from Tarrytown, New York to West Tisbury, Massachusetts, on the island of Martha's Vineyard.

He attended Chilmark Elementary School through 5th grade, West Tisbury Elementary School and Martha's Vineyard Regional High School, where he participated in several local bands such as Keep Thinking, Cultivation, and Slow Leslie. He also was in the MVRHS Minnesingers and performed in musical theater productions.

Career 
Mason's first commercial release was a five-track extended-play album G-Ma's Basement EP. This included solo acoustic recordings of "Live It Up", "Hard Hand to Hold", "Waiter at the Station", "Not Lie Down" and "Oxygen". The album was sold during 2004 live appearances and on the internet.

Mason's popularity rose after Sean Foley, an associate of musician Conor Oberst, discovered his music on a local Martha's Vineyard radio broadcast. Oberst would soon sign Mason to his new record label, Team Love Records and in the summer of 2004, Mason and his brother Sam traveled to Old Soul Studios in the Catskill Mountains, New York, to record Where the Humans Eat. Recording sessions were mostly live, in no more than three takes, featuring Willy Mason's guitar and vocals, and Sam Mason (director) on the drums. Minimal overdubs of guitar, bass and other instruments were added later. The album was released in the U.S. in October 2004, and by Virgin Records in the United Kingdom in February 2005. The album and its singles ("Oxygen" and "So Long"), charted in the UK Singles Chart and Albums Chart in 2005.

After many live appearances throughout 2004 and 2005, culminating with a performance at the Glastonbury Festival, Mason took time off and returned to his family's home on Martha's Vineyard. He began writing new songs and put a band together, featuring Nina Violet on viola and backing vocals, and Zak Borden on mandolin. In early 2006, they began touring the U.S. and Europe, along with other musicians. He supported Beth Orton, Death Cab For Cutie, Radiohead, KT Tunstall and Sondre Lerche.

Mason released his second album, If the Ocean Gets Rough, in March 2007. The same year, he also provided vocals for the track "Battle Scars" on the album We Are the Night (2007) by The Chemical Brothers. The song "Pickup Truck", recorded live at Aboveground Records in Edgartown, Massachusetts, is included on Radio Waves, Vol. 1, a compilation album of music from Martha's Vineyard, and was released on June 29, 2007, to help purchase transmitting equipment for WVVY-LP, a new community radio station. A live set at the Austin City Limits festival was also released in 2007.

Mason also sang on two songs on the album Hawk (2010) by Isobel Campbell and Mark Lanegan. He also featured in "No Room For Doubt", from Lianne La Havas's EP "Lost & Found" (and subsequently her debut album Is Your Love Big Enough?), which was released on October 21, 2011 on the Labour of Love label.

He toured small venues in England, Scotland, Wales and Ireland in 2011, and during the tour he recorded a live session at 80 Hertz Studios in The Sharp Project, Manchester. The single "We Can Be Strong" was featured in the series finale of the British sitcom Fresh Meat' in late 2011.

On September 21, 2012, Mason announced the release of his third album Carry On. It was to be released on December 3, and would be his first album released on Fiction Records. The record was produced by Dan Carey. To accompany the album Mason played a sold-out tour of the UK in the first week of December. In November 2012, Mason toured with Ben Howard as a supporting act. He also toured Australia in October 2012 with Mumford and Sons and Edward Sharpe and the Magnetic Zeros. He performed at Mumford and Sons' Gentlemen of the Road festivals across North America in 2013. An EP Don't Stop Now was released on Communion Records in the US on January 14, 2013, supported by a four-week tour. Communion Records released Carry On in the US in 2013.

On February 5, 2013, Mason and Brendan Benson put to tape Upstairs at United Vol. 7. Benson produced, assembled, and conducted an arsenal of stellar musicians who graced the sacred space upstairs at United Record Pressing with seven songs all written by Mason's folk artist parents Jemima James and Michael Mason.

In September 2015, Mason toured Australia as a member of the ensemble cast of "A State of Grace", a themed concert featuring the music of Tim and Jeff Buckley. Later in the year he provided vocals on Jamie Woon's single Celebration from his album Making Time.

Discography

AlbumsWhere the Humans Eat (2004) No. 38 UK (2005 release)If the Ocean Gets Rough (2007) No. 33 UK, No. 60 IrelandCarry On (2012)Upstairs at United, Vol. 7 - Willy Mason & Brendan Benson (2013)Already Dead (2021)

EPsUntitled (G-Ma's Basement) EP (2004) (U.K. and U.S.)Hard Hand to Hold (Radiate) EP (2004) (U.K. only)Hard to Lie Down (Radiate) EP (2005) (U.K. only)Scraps (Radiate / Astralwerks) EP (2006) (U.S. only)March 28, 2006 EP (2006) (worldwide)It's Easy to Talk EP (2007) (worldwide)gmb01 Live Tour EP (2009) (U.K. only)So Long Baby Shoes EP (2010) (worldwide)Live at Grange Hall (2011) (worldwide)

Singles
"Oxygen (Radiate)" (2005) No. 23 (U.K. only)
"So Long (Radiate)" (2005) No. 45 (U.K. only)
"Hard Hand to Hold " (2005)
"Save Myself (Radiate)" (2007) No. 42 U.K.
"We Can Be Strong" feat KT Tunstall (Radiate)(2007) No. 52 U.K.
"Talk Me Down" (2013)
"Youth On A Spit" (2021) 

Other contributionsWFUV: City Folk Live VII (2004) – "Oxygen"Acoustic 07 (2007, V2 Records) – "Oxygen"The Saturday Sessions: The Dermot O'Leary Show (2007, EMI) – "Careless Whisper"

See also

 List of blues musicians
 List of country music performers
 List of folk musicians
 List of singer-songwriters
 List of people from Massachusetts
 List of people from New York City
 List of Virgin Records artists

References

External links
 
 2007 Interview from BBC Wiltshire
 2004 article from La Blogothèque
 2004 article by Tim McMahon from The Reader''

1984 births
20th-century American singers
21st-century American singers
American blues singers
American blues guitarists
American male guitarists
American blues singer-songwriters
American folk singers
American male singer-songwriters
Fiction Records artists
Folk musicians from Massachusetts
Folk musicians from New York (state)
Living people
People from Martha's Vineyard, Massachusetts
Singer-songwriters from Massachusetts
Singers from New York City
Team Love Records artists
Virgin Records artists
20th-century American guitarists
21st-century American guitarists
Guitarists from Massachusetts
Guitarists from New York City
20th-century American male singers
21st-century American male singers
Singer-songwriters from New York (state)